Marek Walburg (born 16 September 1976) is a retired Polish football defender.

References

1976 births
Living people
Polish footballers
Pogoń Szczecin players
Błękitni Stargard players
KP Chemik Police players
Widzew Łódź players
Boldklubben af 1893 players
Świt Nowy Dwór Mazowiecki players
Association football defenders
Polish expatriate footballers
Expatriate men's footballers in Denmark
Polish expatriate sportspeople in Denmark